Boris Becker defeated Stefan Edberg in the final, 6–4, 6–0, 6–3 to win the singles tennis title at the 1990 Stockholm Open.

Ivan Lendl was the reigning champion, but did not compete that year.

Seeds
All sixteen seeds received a bye to the second round.

  Stefan Edberg (final)
  Boris Becker (champion)
  Andre Agassi (second round)
  Pete Sampras (semifinals)
  Andrés Gómez (second round)
  Emilio Sánchez (second round)
  Brad Gilbert (quarterfinals)
  John McEnroe (third round)
  Goran Ivanišević (quarterfinals)
  Andrei Chesnokov (third round)
  Aaron Krickstein (second round)
  Michael Chang (third round)
  Guy Forget (third round)
  Guillermo Pérez Roldán (second round)
  Jonas Svensson (second round)
  Jay Berger (second round)

Draw

Finals

Top half

Section 1

Section 2

Bottom half

Section 3

Section 4

External links
 1990 Stockholm Open draw

Singles